Pseudokamosia is a species of beetles in the family Buprestidae, the jewel beetles. The sole species is Pseudokamosia meridionalis. It is native to Africa.

References

External links

Monotypic Buprestidae genera
Beetles of Africa